Metiochodes is an Asian genus of "sword-tail crickets", in the subfamily Trigonidiinae and the tribe Trigonidiini.

Species
Metiochodes species are recorded from: Angola, Sri Lanka, the Andaman islands, southern China, Vietnam, Malesia and Australia (distribution is probably incomplete).  The Orthoptera Species File lists:
Metiochodes acutiparamerus Li, He & Liu, 2010
Metiochodes annulicercis Chopard, 1962
Metiochodes australicus Chopard, 1951
Metiochodes denticulatus Liu & Shi, 2011
Metiochodes flavescens Chopard, 1932 - type species
Metiochodes fulvus Chopard, 1940
Metiochodes gracilus Ma & Pan, 2019
Metiochodes greeni Chopard, 1925
Metiochodes karnyi Chopard, 1930
Metiochodes minor Li, He & Liu, 2010
Metiochodes ornatus Chopard, 1969
Metiochodes platycephalus Chopard, 1940
Metiochodes sikkimensis Bhowmik, 1968
Metiochodes striatus Bhowmik, 1970
Metiochodes thankolomara Otte & Alexander, 1983
Metiochodes tibeticus Li, He & Liu, 2010
Metiochodes tindalei Chopard, 1951
Metiochodes trilineatus Chopard, 1936
Metiochodes truncatus Li, He & Liu, 2010

References

External links
 

Ensifera genera
Trigonidiidae
Orthoptera of Asia